Evans Gwekwerere (born 27 April 1985) is a retired Zimbabwean football striker. A Zimbabwe international, he played at the 2009 COSAFA Cup.

References 

1985 births
Living people
Zimbabwean footballers
Zimbabwe international footballers
Association football forwards
Zimbabwean expatriate footballers
Expatriate soccer players in South Africa
Zimbabwean expatriate sportspeople in South Africa
Expatriate footballers in Botswana
Zimbabwean expatriate sportspeople in Botswana
Expatriate footballers in Mozambique
Zimbabwean expatriate sportspeople in Mozambique
Dynamos F.C. players
Moroka Swallows F.C. players
F.C. AK players
Jomo Cosmos F.C. players
CAPS United players
Township Rollers F.C. players
Black Mambas F.C. players
Buffaloes F.C. players
GDR Textáfrica players
Clube Ferroviário de Maputo footballers